Basil Vine (1908 – 2 November 1965) was a New Zealand cricket umpire. He stood in one Test match, New Zealand vs. West Indies, in 1952.

See also
 List of Test cricket umpires
 West Indian cricket team in New Zealand in 1951–52

References

1908 births
1965 deaths
People from Wellington City
New Zealand Test cricket umpires